The Coat of arms of the Republic of Cabinda exists under various forms.

Flags of the world version 

The version on Flags of the World (FOTW) the inner part of what has also been reported to be part of the national flag is the coat of arms. 

This one also resembles the FLEC flag. The orientation of its star has been discussed on FOTW.

Cabinda free state version 

The version from Cabinda free state is also being shown on passports and identity cards that have been produced.

FLEC version 
The Front for the Liberation of the Enclave of Cabinda (FLEC), as well as the Cabinda Government in exile have their own version, showing the monument to the Simulambuco treaty between Portugal and Cabinda principality.
 This version appears on a "resistance card".

References 

Republic of Cabinda
Cabinda